The Exile of Capri is a 1959 novel by French writer Roger Peyrefitte, based on the lives of Jacques d'Adelswärd-Fersen and Nino Cesarini.

Plot Summary 
The book starts with a handsome Frenchman in his early 30s meeting a beautiful young seventeen-year-old French boy on the crest of Vesuvius in 1897. They befriend at first sight, and each starts to suspect that they have something more in common than a love for climbing mountains.

Bibliography 
 "L'exilé De Capri". Roger Peyrefitte. Flammarion. . 1959
 "The Exile of Capri". Roger Peyrefitte. Translation: Edward Hyams. Secker & Warburg. 1961
 "The Exile of Capri". Roger Peyrefitte. Foreword by Jean Cocteau. Fleet Publishing Corporation. . 1965.
 "El exiliado de Capri". Roger Peyrefitte. Paperback. Editorial Egales. . 2006

References 

1950s LGBT novels
1959 French novels
French books
French LGBT novels
Novels with gay themes
Novels set in Italy